Snow Job is a 1972 American independent thriller film directed by George Englund and starring Jean-Claude Killy, Danièle Gaubert, Vittorio De Sica, Lelio Luttazzi, and Cliff Potts.

Premise
A skiing instructor in the Italian Alps robs the winter resort where he works with the help of a down-on-his-luck ski-racer.

Cast
 Jean-Claude Killy: Christian Biton
 Danièle Gaubert: Monica Scotti
 Cliff Potts: Bob Skinner
 Vittorio De Sica: Enrico Dolphi
 Delia Boccardo: Lorraine Borman
 Lelio Luttazzi: Bank Manager
 Umberto D'Orsi: Vito
 Giancarlo Prete: Donato
 Gigi Ballista

See also
 List of American films of 1972

References

External links
 

1972 films
1970s thriller films
Films directed by George Englund
Films set in Italy
American heist films
American skiing films
Warner Bros. films
1970s English-language films
1970s American films